Tsai Pei-ling (born 8 March 1987) is a Taiwanese badminton player. She was part of the national junior team that won the bronze medal at the 2004 Asian Junior Championships in the girls' team event.  She graduated at the University of Taipei. Tsai was the champion at the Kaohsiung International tournament in the women's doubles event partnered with Chou Chia-chi. At the Grand Prix tournament, she finished as the women's doubles runner-up at the 2008 U.S. Open.

Achievements

BWF Grand Prix 
The BWF Grand Prix has two level such as Grand Prix and Grand Prix Gold. It is a series of badminton tournaments, sanctioned by Badminton World Federation (BWF) since 2007.

Women's doubles

 BWF Grand Prix Gold tournament
 BWF Grand Prix tournament

BWF International Challenge/Series 
Women's doubles

 BWF International Challenge tournament
 BWF International Series tournament

References

External links
 

1987 births
Living people
Taiwanese female badminton players
University of Taipei alumni
Universiade medalists in badminton
Universiade bronze medalists for Chinese Taipei
Medalists at the 2007 Summer Universiade
21st-century Taiwanese women